Haydar Hatemi (born March 3, 1945 in Hadishahr) is an Iranian artist whose work is based on blends of classical oriental styles such as miniature and tazhib, with some modern elements. His early studies in art started at Tabriz's Art Academy after finishing high school in Tabriz, Iran.

Hatemi is a graduate of the prestigious Fine Arts Academy of Tehran University. He moved to Turkey in 1983. He is one of the most significant artists of the Iranian diaspora. He has been working under the commission of the Qatari Royal family for the last decade.

Biography

Early life 
Hatemi, an ethnic Azerbaijani, started painting aged 14, while he was continuing high school in Tabriz. His early studies in art started at Tabriz's Art Academy after finishing Tabriz middle school, Iran. It was during this time there that he learned the tazhib technique from Master Abduhl Bageri and studied sculpture techniques from Master Ashot Babayan. He continued his art studies at the Art Academy of Tehran and was privileged to be trained under masters Hussain Behzad and Abu Talib Mugimi.

Shah's era 
Hatemi soon gained celebrity status during his sophomore year in college when he won the national award for designing the Takht-e-Tavus medal for the international Cancer Society. This award was presented to him by the Queen of Iran, Farah Pahlavi. Hatemi also taught sculpture classes in Shahnaz Pahlavi Art Academy.

During his college years in Tehran University, Hatemi won first place in multiple competitions which included design of the Logo of the Isfahan University and the Logo of the Shahpur Petro-Chemicals. He also designed the gold coins in commemoration of the 2500th anniversary of the Persian Empire.

Between 1972-1978, Hatemi established the Design Art Centre in Tehran and produced very large sculptures commissioned by the Mayor of Tehran. His statue of Shah Abbas on horseback is on display at Isfahan's Square and the statue Birds and the Rock at Argentina Square in Tehran.

After 1979 - Istanbul, Turkey
After the Iranian revolution, Hatemi moved to Turkey with his young family in 1983. He continued his painting in Bursa and Istanbul and started the orientalist movement within the Turkish art world. During this period his paintings became part of the Sabancı Collection and many other private collections.

Work

Paintings 
Early in his career, Hatemi took great interest in the tazhib technique and miniature paintings in particular. His main goal to apply his style to Ottoman Empire theme was very well received by the Turkish art scene. His admiration for miniature masters and his desire to apply this to a newer subjects lead to the creation of his "Stories of the Messengers" series in the early 2003 which became his most celebrated and famous series. In these series, Hatemi depicts stories of messengers which are common to Quran, Bible and Torah.

He also paints scenes of old Istanbul which was commissioned by the royal family of Qatar. Istanbul & Istanbul series are the best example for this technique.

See also 
 List of Persian painters

References

Biography of Haydar Hatemi
Al Jazeera: Son Saray Ressami
Hazar World: The Last Ottoman Painter at the Royal Palace

1945 births
Living people
Iranian painters
Turkish painters
People from Tabriz
Turkish people of Iranian descent
American people of Iranian descent
People from East Azerbaijan Province
Turkish people of Azerbaijani descent
American people of Azerbaijani descent
Iranian emigrants to Turkey
20th-century Iranian people
21st-century Iranian people